Nanna Lüders Jensen (born 23 July 1963) is a Danish songwriter and singer known by the stage name Nanna. She has released several albums as a solo artist since her debut in 1982.

In addition to her work as a solo artist, Nanna has featured on a large number of other artist's works. During the 1980s and early 90s she worked with several groups, such as Poul Krebs & The Bookhouse Boys, Hobo-Ekspressen, and Sweet Intentions. As of 2020, she reportedly has over 100 credits for release by other artists. She has also appeared on several talk shows and in various documentaries.

Career 
In 1982, Nanna made her debut with her song "Om lidt så lægger jeg dig ned;" she was 18 years old at the time. The single was followed by three albums produced by Kim Sagild: Nanna (1982), Små Blå breve (1984), and Shi-bu-mi (1985). In 1984, she was made famous by her hit single "Buster", the theme song for Bille August's children's television series and movie Busters verden.

In 1985, Nanna won a competition organized by the Danish Red Cross to write a song in connection with the relief effort for 1983–1985 famine in Ethiopia, which also affected Eritrea. The competition was inspired by the song We Are the World. Her song "Afrika" featured a number of major Danish artists from the mid-1980s and won  a Grammy award. The song raised more than 3 million DKK for the Danish Red Cross, and is the most lucrative Danish relief song to date.

In 2000, she was given a grant by the Danish Arts Foundation. She released the resulting album, Giv dig hen, in 2005.

Personal life 
After an absence from her public career, she published her autobiography Stjerne for altid in 2005. In her book, she opened up about her experiences with crippling stage fright, depression, and anxiety as a result of her rise to fame at such a young age. She has been open about her use of anti-depressants and has self-medicated using cannabis.

Nanna was married to Niels Rasmusen, though they have since divorced. The couple have a daughter, Freja, who was born in 1999. Nanna dated musician and producer Hilmer Hassig in the early 2000s, though their relationship was not revealed until after he died in a car accident in 2008.

Discography

Albums 
Nanna (1982)
Små, Blå Breve (1983)
Shi-bu-mi (1985)
Fannys hjerte (1988)
I Danmark er jeg født (1989)
Rocking Horse (1991)
Prinsesse Himmel-i-mund (1995)
Honey I'm home (1997)
Sangen Har Vinger (1997, with Mikkel Nordsø)
Giv dig hen (2005)
Nødigt, men dog gerne (2011)
Nannas Juleguf (2014, EP)
Cowboyland (2015)

Compilations 

 Pletskud og vildskud (2005)

Singles 

 "Om lidt så lægger jeg dig ned" (1982)
 "I Think I'll Kiss You For A Start" (1984)
 "Buster" (1984)
 "Helst Om Kærlighed" (1984)
 "Sammenhold, Du (1984)
 "Deja Vu" (1984)
 "Afrika" (1985)
 "Et Sted i Det Blå" (1987)
 "I Skovens Dybe Stille Ro" (1989) 
 "Go Your Own Way" (1991) 
 "Det er et Yndigt Land" (1993)
 "Danny" (1995)
 "Confidence" (1997)

Filmography

References

External links

1963 births
20th-century Danish women singers
Living people
Danish women singer-songwriters
21st-century Danish women singers